= L'Écho taurin =

- Type: Weekly (1882), Seasonal (1932)
- Founded: 1882
- Language: French language
- Headquarters: Béziers

L'Écho taurin was a publication from Béziers, France which called for support to 'bull-fighting and southern freedoms'. It was founded as a weekly newspaper in 1882. In 1932 it became a seasonal publication. In the 1930s, its director was J. Rodriguez.
